Al Da'iya is an area located in Kuwait City that was established around 1960. It is part of Al Asimah Governorate. It is named after Sheikh Duaj Al Salman Al Sabah, the first to live in this area who the leader of the Kuwaiti army which fought in the Battle of Himth in 1919. Daiya is the headquarters of the Kuwait Handball Association.

References

Suburbs of Kuwait City